National Youth Leadership Training, often called NYLT, is the current youth leadership development training offered by the Boy Scouts of America. The program is conducted at the council level over six days for Scouts, Venturers, and Sea Scouts. The program has been open to all genders since 2010.  This training is a part of the national organization's leadership training program and is designed to mirror themes found in Woodbadge, which is the BSA program for adult leadership training.

History

In 1949 Scouts from 24 councils in 16 states formed a Junior Leader Training Troop at Philmont Scout Ranch for a forty-day training program in leadership and Scoutcraft. In 1950 the "Junior Leaders' Training Course was developed to give intensive training in Scouting skills and techniques to select Explorers. Each is trained with the end in view that he in turn will train other junior leaders. The course has four parts. The first is centered around studying leadership methods, organization, patrol method, Explorer crews, troop meetings, and camping skills. The second part deals with teaching the same skills. The third sees the trainees actually living the patrol method, using the Scouting skills. The fourth part is devoted to a model junior leaders’ conference, and projects in nature lore, special Scoutcraft skills, emergency service, and personal and group service.” In 1952 at Philmont Scout Ranch 270 participants and at Schiff Scout Reservation 436 participants completed junior leader training camps. At Schiff the program lasted for twelve days, a practice that continued until 1972. In 1974 the Boy Scouts of America published the Troop Leadership Development Staff Guide.

In the 1980s and 1990s, the curriculum was called Junior Leader Training (JLT). Building upon the base of JLT, in 2003 and 2004, NYLT was piloted across the country and rolled out in 2005.

In 2009 the practice of adding names like Pine Tree and Golden Acorn to the program was supposed to end. Some councils ignore that policy and use Grey Wolf NYLT, Top Gun National Youth Leadership Training, Silver Bear NYLT, Golden Falcon NYLT, Timberline NYLT, and Brownsea NYLT. In 2010, Boy Scout and Venturing youth leadership training merged and the curriculum language was modified to reflect the combined nature of the program.

Program

Participants are organized in teams of no more than eight, mirroring a typical local patrol and troop. A staff member, called a troop guide, is assigned to each patrol (a team) to coach, mentor, and present some sessions and activities, much as a den chief would in a den of a pack. During the training the senior patrol leader performs the same function for the training cohort as a senior patrol leader does for a troop: running meetings and events, delegating responsibilities, assisting Scoutmasters, modeling learning, displaying leadership, and recruiting participation. In addition to generally assisting the senior patrol leader, the assistant senior patrol leader is expected to oversee audiovisual support, guide the service patrol, inspect campsites, and prepare a model campsite. Some participants find the combination of technology and outdoor education problematic. Administrative services and rule compliance are left to the adult supervision. The training is presented either in a one-week format or can be split over two or three weekends. The program is often conducted at resident camps.

The program includes patrol games and other activities used to teach event planning, communication, team development, teaching, leadership styles, setting goals, problem solving and other leadership skills including Baden-Powell's Patrol Method. Patrols compete in lashing, fire building, and a geocache game. Creating a vision of success, setting goals, making plans, listening, problem solving, teaching, leading, and putting the needs of others first are all presented as important to effective leadership. The program provides opportunities to make difficult decisions using the tools of the Scout Oath and Law.

The EDGE model is, and included in the NYLT programme, the EDGE model is used by Scoutmaster, an assistant Scoutmaster, or an experienced youth knowledgeable in EDGE to be taught to the troop. The steps are:

Explain — "The trainer explains how something is done."
Demonstrate — "The trainer demonstrates while explaining again."
Guide — "The learner tries the skill while the trainer guides him through it."
Enable — "The learner works on his own under the eye of the trainer."

Program objectives include developing confidence, knowledge, leadership, teaching, motivation, team working, sharing ideas, sharing experiences, strengthening relationships between youth and adults, fellowship, and fun. Many of the key course concepts are represented as mnemonics including planning and problem-solving tools that focus on what, how, when, and who; the start, stop, continue method of assessing progress; forming, storming, norming, performing often labeled the stages of team development; explain, demonstrate, guide, and enable or EDGE method (consult pages 38–39 in the 13th and 14th editions of the Scouts BSA Handbook which describes the Teaching EDGE method); express, address, and resolve or EAR conflict resolution tool; right vs. wrong, right vs. right, and trivial ethical decision making; message, sender, and receiver communication; and reach out, organize, practice, and experience or ROPE approach to human value.

References

Leadership training of the Boy Scouts of America
Youth in the United States
2003 establishments in the United States